Venus Genetrix may refer to: 

 Venus Genetrix, epithet of the goddess Venus
 Venus Genetrix (sculpture), the name for a type of sculptural depiction of the goddess
 Temple of Venus Genetrix, a ruined temple in the Forum of Caesar, Rome

See also 

 Genetrix (disambiguation)
 Venus (disambiguation)